Beit She'an is a town in the Northern District of Israel.

Beit She'an or Bet She'an may also refer to:

Beit She'an Valley
Beit She'an railway station
Hapoel Beit She'an F.C., Israeli football club
Bnot Beit She'an F.C.,  Israeli women's football club

See also